The women's 20 km walk event at the 2008 Olympic Games took place on August 21 at the Beijing Olympic Stadium. The qualifying standards were 1:33.30 (A standard) and 1:38.00 (B standard).

Records
Prior to this event, the existing world and Olympic records were as follows:

Schedule
All times are China standard time (UTC+8)

Results

OR - Olympic Record, NR - National Record, PB - Personal Best (= - Equaled), SB - Season Best

Intermediates

s.t. - same time.

References

Athletics at the 2008 Summer Olympics
Racewalking at the Olympics
2008 in women's athletics
Women's events at the 2008 Summer Olympics